Arbeit - Bewegung - Geschichte ("Labour - Movement - History") is an academic journal covering the history of labour and other social movements. It was established in 2002 as Jahrbuch für Forschungen zur Geschichte der Arbeiterbewegung ("Yearbook on Labour History") and renamed in 2016.

Each issue has a main section of historical essays dealing with a variety of subjects such as the history of women's liberation, social movements in general or the antifascist resistance movements in Germany and Europe. Its main focus nevertheless is the history of the international labour and union movements, including organizations such as the Comintern and its member parties as well as social-democratic parties.

References

External links 
 
 Review by Andreas Diers
 Review in the German daily newspaper Neues Deutschland
List entry in European Reference Index for the Humanities and Social Sciences (ERIH PLUS)

Labour journals
Triannual journals
German-language journals
Publications established in 2002
2002 establishments in Germany
History of work